Massapequa Park is a station on the Babylon Branch of the Long Island Rail Road. It is officially located on New York State Route 27 and Park Boulevard in Massapequa Park, New York, although there are parking lots along Front Street and north of the station. All parking lots require Village of Massapequa Park residential permits.

History
Massapequa Park station is typical of the elevated Babylon Branch stations that were rebuilt during the mid-to-late 20th century. The station originally opened as a platformed shelter on December 2, 1933, east of Massapequa station where Robert Moses wanted to extend the Bethpage State Parkway. It was replaced in 1966 by a temporary station, then in 1968 it received high platforms for the M1. A new temporary station was built to the south of the old one in December 1977 for the grade crossing elimination project. The current elevated station opened on December 13, 1980, making it the last station to be elevated along the Babylon Branch.

In January 2022, the MTA announced that it would add a project to make Massapequa Park station ADA-accessible in the 2020–2024 Capital Program.

Station layout
The station has one 12-car-long high-level island platform between the two tracks. 

Some morning rush-hour westbound trains originate at Massapequa Park station. This station is also a terminus for some eastbound rush-hour trains in the afternoon.

References

External links 

Old Massapequa Park Station (Arrt's Arrchives)
 Park Boulevard entrance from Google Maps Street View
 Station House from Google Maps Street View

Oyster Bay (town), New York
Long Island Rail Road stations in Nassau County, New York
Railway stations in the United States opened in 1933
1933 establishments in New York (state)